The Don River is a river located in North Queensland, Australia.

Course and features

High salinity levels have been recorded at the mouth of the river. Land use in the upper catchment is mostly beef cattle production with crops grown in the richer soils downstream.

The river is crossed by the Bruce Highway via the Don River Bridge at Bowen.

Flooding
The highest recorded flood was in 1970 when the river reached  at the Bowen Pumping Station. The river delta is particularly vulnerable to flooding during cyclones.

Floods in 2008 left deposits of sand which raised the riverbed considerably. Approval to dredge sand was granted by the Queensland Government however only about half of that has been removed in recent years. A flood in 2008 lead the Whitsunday Regional Council to create a channel so that similar flooding could be avoided.

A management plan for the river was established late in 2008.  It included measures to encourage further sand extraction.

See also

References

Rivers of Queensland
North Queensland
Bodies of water of the Coral Sea